The GK80 is a Chinese steel combat helmet first developed in the late 1960s. Developed as part of a Chinese military aid to Albania in response to the Sino-Soviet split, the helmet was initially designated as the "Type 69" and was only issued in small numbers within the People's Liberation Army. An improved design was re-designated as the GK80 and was adopted as the standard combat helmet of the PLA in 1980. The move was part of a PLA modernization program immediately after encountering drawbacks in the Sino-Vietnamese War in 1979, which the PLA realized the necessity to modernize its arsenal.

The GK80 in PLA service is being replaced by the aramid construction QGF02/03 helmets.

Users

  Kachin Independence Army
  United Wa State Army
  National Democratic Alliance Army
  Sahrawi People's Liberation Army

References

Combat helmets of the People's Republic of China
Military equipment introduced in the 1960s